The Wachusett Dam in Clinton, Massachusetts, impounds the Nashua River, creating the Wachusett Reservoir. Construction started in 1897 and was completed in 1905. It is part of the Nashua River Watershed.

This dam is part of greater Boston's water system, maintained and controlled by the Massachusetts Water Resources Authority (MWRA). Its discharge is into the Nashua River. When it was completed in 1905, the Wachusett Reservoir was the largest public water supply reservoir in the world. At that time, the Wachusett Reservoir Dam was the largest gravity dam in the world as well.

Construction
The Metropolitan Water Board selected the south branch of the Nashua River in Clinton as the best site for Boston's new water supply over New Hampshire's Lake Winnipesaukee, Maine's Sebago Lake, and the Merrimack River.

Churches, factories, homes, and schools within the valley had to be knocked down or moved. Roads and rail lines had to be relocated; a railroad tunnel and trestle had to be built in order to relocate the Central Massachusetts Railroad, and over four thousand bodies had to be dug up and moved in the local Catholic cemetery. The project brought thousands of immigrants to the area for work.

The dam created the world's largest water supply reservoir at the time. It is still considered the largest "hand dug" dam in the world today.

Early problems
A static liquefaction flow failure occurred in the upstream slope of the North Dike of Wachusett Dam near Clinton, Massachusetts on April 11, 1907 during the first reservoir filling. The fine sands of the upstream dike shell liquefied and flowed approximately 100 meters horizontally into the reservoir.

Gallery

See also
Wachusett Aqueduct
National Register of Historic Places listings in Worcester County, Massachusetts

References

External links

 
 USGS

Dams in Massachusetts
Historic districts in Worcester County, Massachusetts
Buildings and structures in Clinton, Massachusetts
Dams completed in 1905
National Register of Historic Places in Worcester County, Massachusetts
Historic districts on the National Register of Historic Places in Massachusetts
Dams on the National Register of Historic Places in Massachusetts
1905 establishments in Massachusetts